The 2016–17 SV Werder Bremen II season is the 6th season for the football club in the 3. Liga. The season covers a period from 1 July 2016 to 30 June 2017.

Players

Squad

Competitions

3. Liga

League table

Results summary

Results by round

Matches

References

External links
Official website
SV Werder Bremen II at worldfootball.net

SV Werder Bremen II seasons
Werder Bremen II, SV